The 2013–14 FC Girondins de Bordeaux season was the 133rd professional season of the club since its creation in 1881. During the campaign, the club competed in Ligue 1, the top level of French football, along with the Coupe de France, the Coupe de la Ligue the Trophée des Champions and the UEFA Europa League.

Players

First team squad

French teams are limited to four players without EU citizenship. Hence, the squad list includes only the principal nationality of each player; several non-European players on the squad have dual citizenship with an EU country. Also, players from the ACP countries—countries in Africa, the Caribbean, and the Pacific that are signatories to the Cotonou Agreement—are not counted against non-EU quotas due to the Kolpak ruling.

Out on loan

Transfers

Transfers in

Transfers out

Squad statistics

Top scorers

Last updated: 29 January 2015Source: CompetitionsCompetitive matches only

Disciplinary record

Last updated:29 January 2015Source: CompetitionsCompetitive matches only * indicates a second yellow card

Competitions

Trophée des Champions

Ligue 1

League table

Results summary

Results by round

Matches

Coupe de France

Coupe de la Ligue

UEFA Europa League

Group stage

References

FC Girondins de Bordeaux seasons
Bordeaux
Bordeaux